Athanassios Kalogiannis (10 September 1965 – 23 October 2017) was a Greek Olympic hurdler. He represented his country in the men's 400 metres hurdles at the 1992 Summer Olympics, as well as in the men's 400 metres hurdles at the 1984 Summer Olympics. His time was a 51.27 in 1984, and a 49.52 in 1992.

After retiring from the sport, he worked as a fashion photographer. He died on 23 October 2017, from a pulmonary edema.

References

1965 births
2017 deaths
Athletes from Volos
Fashion photographers
Greek male hurdlers
Olympic athletes of Greece
Athletes (track and field) at the 1984 Summer Olympics
Athletes (track and field) at the 1992 Summer Olympics
Universiade silver medalists for Greece
Universiade medalists in athletics (track and field)
Greek photographers
20th-century Greek people